Mike Caldwell may refer to:

 Mike Caldwell (baseball) (born 1949), American baseball pitcher
 Mike Caldwell (linebacker) (born 1971), former American football linebacker
 Mike Caldwell (wide receiver) (born 1971), former American football wide receiver

See also
 Michael Caldwell (born 1989), politician